Pogonopus is a genus of flowering plants belonging to the family Rubiaceae.

Its native range is Tropical America.

Species:

Pogonopus exsertus 
Pogonopus speciosus 
Pogonopus tubulosus

References

Dialypetalantheae
Rubiaceae genera